Cârligele River may refer to:

 Cârligele, a tributary of the Sadu in Sibiu County
 Cârligele, a tributary of the Văsălatu in Argeș County

See also 
 Cârligu River (disambiguation)
 Cârlig (disambiguation)